Manhunt International is an International Male Model Search for the next MALE SUPERMODEL, which began in 1993, though the roots of the pageant go back a few years more to when one single national preliminary was held in Singapore. The pageant was conceived by Metromedia Singapore and Procon Leisure International which become co-partners in 1993.

The current Manhunt International winner is Australia's Lochlan "Lochie" Carey.

History 
Manhunt International wears the crown as the world's first and most prestigious of all pageants and competitions for men. Its roots began in 1988 when Alex Liu, pageant director of Metromedia Singapore, decided to stage the first male model contest in Singapore announcing a “Manhunt.” Manhunt International Organisation was officially formed in 1993 by Liu, with a dream to offer the men of the world a platform to showcase their talents and skills.

The first ever Manhunt International World Final was held in Australia in 1993 with 25 contestants. The pageant remained on Australia's Gold Coast when Nikos Papadakis of Greece won in 1994. The current president, Rosko Dickinson & Liu began the co-ownerships and partners of Manhunt International from 1994, until Liu's death in January 2018.

Manhunt International is organized in a macho way with outdoor activities, thrilling events, public presentations, talent competitions, fun routines, and even a chance to meet and impress ladies. Contestants are judged on their runway skills, photogenic ability, personality, and physical attributes. The pageant is organized to promote new faces in the male modelling and fashion industry. The men that enter Manhunt International are also encouraged to become role models and good corporate citizens for younger people to look up to.

Today, Manhunt International is easily the World's most recognized and longest-running international male model contest. It is the worldwide search for the best male models with the highest number of contestants in 2006 and 2012 in China and Thailand respectively.

Several countries have hosted the world finals including Australia (1993, 1994, 1998, 2018), Singapore (1995, 1997, 2000), Philippines (1999, 2020, 2022), China (2001, 2002, 2006, 2016), Korea (2005, 2007, 2008, 2011), Taiwan (2010) and Thailand (2012, 2017).

Eligibility criteria

Competition 
The Manhunt competition is staged in two rounds, preliminary and final. During the preliminaries, the contestants are judged in Haute Couture Fashion, Swimwear, Formal Evening wear. The contestants with highest scores are named as finalists, from which the judges determine the winner and the runners up.

During the finals, several other awards are also given besides the ultimate title of Manhunt International: Best Runway Model, Mister Photogenic, Mister Friendship, Mister Personality, Mister Physique and Mister Popularity (voted by the public via social media). Since the 2005 edition, Manhunt International has also given five continental awards to the best representatives of each continent. In the 2007 edition, it was announced that the winner of Mister Popularity would automatically advance to final round and in 2022 a new category was introduced called Digital Challenge (Video) with three segments being Runway Challenge, Swimwear/Physique and Casting Challenge. Once again the overall winner of the category went straight in to the Top 16.

Titleholders

League tables

Country by number of wins

Continents by number of wins 

Notes

Victory Rank by Country

21st Edition (2022) 
The 21st edition of the Manhunt International was announced by the organisation's president, Rosko Dickinson, on 18 May 2022 via the official Instagram account. 40 countries delegates arrived in Manila, Philippines on 23 September with the Gala Grand Final night took place on Saturday 1 October 2022. Paul Luzineau of Netherlands crowned Lochlan “Lochie” Carey of Australia as his successor at the end of the event.

Results

Placements 

Notes:
Δ – placed into the Top 16 by fast-track challenges

Order of announcements

Top 16
 (fan vote)

Top 10

Delegates 
38 contestants had been confirmed via the official Facebook and Instagram account:

See also 
 Mister International
 Mister World
 Mister Global
 Mister Supranational
 Man of the World

Notes

References

External links 
 Official Website
Official Instagram

 
Recurring events established in 1993
Male beauty pageants